Naquetia is a genus of medium-sized sea snails, marine gastropod mollusks in the family Muricidae, the rock snails or murex snails.

Species
Species within the genus Naquetia include:
 Naquetia annandalei (Preston, 1910)
 Naquetia barclayi (Reeve, 1858)
 Naquetia cumingii (A. Adams, 1853)
 Naquetia fosteri D'Attilio & Hertz, 1987
 Naquetia jickelii (Tapparone Canefri, 1875)
 Naquetia manwaii Houart & Héros, 2013
 Naquetia rhondae Houart & Lorenz, 2015
 Naquetia triqueter (Born, 1778)
 Naquetia vokesae Houart, 1986
Species brought into synonymy 
 Naquetia capucina (Lamarck, 1822): synonym of Chicoreus capucinus (Lamarck, 1822)
 Naquetia superbus (G. B. Sowerby III, 1889): synonym of Chicomurex superbus (G. B. Sowerby III, 1889)

References

 Houart, R., Moe, C. & Chen C. (2021). Living species of the genera Chicomurex Arakawa, 1964 and Naquetia Jousseaume, 1880 (Gastropoda: Muricidae) in the Indo-West Pacific. Novapex. 22 (hors-série 14): 1-52.
 Merle D., Garrigues B. & Pointier J.-P. (2011) Fossil and Recent Muricidae of the world. Part Muricinae. Hackenheim: Conchbooks. 648 pp.

External links
 Nomenclator Zoologicus info
 Jousseaume F. P. (1880). Division méthodique de la famille des Purpuridés. Le Naturaliste 2(42): 335-338

Muricinae
Gastropod genera
Gastropods described in 1880
Taxa named by Félix Pierre Jousseaume